Bulat is both a masculine give name and surname with various origins. As a masculine given name, it is derived from a Turkic word meaning "steel", ultimately from Persian.

Notable people with the surname include:

 Alexandra Bulat, Romanian-English politician
 Basia Bulat (born 1984), Canadian singer-songwriter
 Gajo Bulat (1836–1900), Croatian lawyer and politician
 Iurie Bulat (born 1994), Moldovan weightlifter
 Ivan Bulat (born 1975), Croatian football player
 Lev Bulat (1947–2016), Russian physicist
 
 Nicolae Bulat (1952–2022), Moldovan historian
 Nikol Bulat (born 1987), Croatian singer
 Rade Bulat (1920–2013), Yugoslav Partisan
 Tamara Bulat (1933–2004), Ukrainian-American musicologist
 Tihomir Bulat (born 1974), Croatian football player
 Tomás Bulat (1964–2015), Argentine economist and journalist
 Victor Bulat (born 1985), Moldovan football player
 Viktor Bulat (born 1971), Belarusian athlete
 Vitalie Bulat (born 1987), Moldovan football player
 Virginia C. Bulat (1938–1986), American author and historian

Notable people with the given name include:

 Bulat Abilov, Kazakh businessman and politician
 Bulat Aqchulaqov, Kazakh deputy Minister of Energy and Mineral Resources 
 Bulat Iskakov, Kazakh diplomat
 Bulat Jumadilov, Kazakh boxer
 Bulat Okudzhava, Georgian "author's song" musician
 Bulat Utemuratov (born 1957), Kazakh businessman and diplomat

See also
 Bulatov
 Bulatović

References

Kazakh masculine given names
Croatian surnames
Serbian surnames
Romanian-language surnames
Surnames of Moldovan origin
Ukrainian-language surnames
Belarusian-language surnames